Gene Walet can refer to:

 Gene Walet Jr. (1901–1968), American Olympic sailor
 Gene Walet III (born 1935), American Olympic sailor